Codium edule is a green alga common on shallow reef flats from the intertidal to the subtidal in tropical waters of the Indo-Pacific. The species is common in Hawaiʻi where it is usually called wāwaeʻiole (meaning "ratʻs foot") and considered an edible alga or limu. Prominent ethnobotanist, Isabella Abbott, described its usage in her writing.

Description
Codium edule is dark green and velvety in appearance with irregular to dichotomous branches, often forming mats of up to 25 cm across. The type location is Waikiki.

Human use
The species is edible and in Hawaiʻi is eaten with fish or in a stew. The limu needs first to be washed carefully as grains of sand, pieces of shells and other debris get caught in the mats.

References

Codium
Hawaiian cuisine
Species described in 1952